Let the Sunshine In, or Bright Sunshine In, is a 2017 French romantic drama film directed by Claire Denis. The film is an adaptation of Roland Barthes's 1977 text A Lover's Discourse: Fragments (French: Fragments d’un discours amoureux). Novelist Christine Angot and frequent Denis collaborator Jean-Pol Fargeau have both been reported as Denis's co-writers on the project. It opened the Directors' Fortnight section of the 2017 Cannes Film Festival. At Cannes, it won the SACD Award.

Plot
Isabelle, a middle-aged divorced artist, has an unsatisfying relationship with a married banker, Vincent, who enjoys the sex with her but is committed emotionally to his wife. Looking for love, she begins a series of other relationships.

She meets and feels an instant connection with an actor who, after she sleeps with him, reveals he is not separated from his wife despite what he had said earlier. She begins sleeping with her ex-husband but picks a fight, ending their relationship. Isabelle is wooed eventually by Marc, influential in the art world, who says he wants things to progress slowly and offers a serious relationship. However, Isabelle sees a psychic, who tells her that, although the relationship will not last, she should keep looking for the right man.

Cast

Production
Director Claire Denis and Christine Angot co-wrote the screenplay of the film. Juliette Binoche played the lead role in the film. The film began shooting in January 2017 in Creuse, France. Shooting wrapped on 21 February 2017. The film was shot by Agnès Godard. Etta James' version of the song "At Last" was used in the film.

Release
The film had its world premiere as the opening film of the Directors' Fortnight section at the 2017 Cannes Film Festival on 18 May 2017. It was released in France on 27 September 2017.

Critical reception
On review aggregator Rotten Tomatoes, the film holds an approval rating of 86% based on 140 reviews, with a weighted average rating of 7.3/10. The website's critical consensus reads, "Let the Sunshine In pairs a powerful performance from Juliette Binoche with a layered drama that presents director Claire Denis at her most assured." On Metacritic, the film has a weighted average score of 79 out of 100, based on 33 critics, indicating "generally favorable reviews".

Glen Kenny of RogerEbert.com gave the film 4 stars out of 4, saying, "the film does confront the fact that particularly for women, pursuing desire in middle age is a fraught path." Greg Cwik of Slant Magazine called it "the most empathetic, heartfelt film of [Claire Denis'] illustrious career."

Accolades

References

External links
 

2017 films
2017 romantic drama films
French romantic drama films
2010s French-language films
Films directed by Claire Denis
Films set in Paris
2010s French films